History of the Iran national football team began with the team's first international match on 23 August 1941. The Iranian Football Federation was founded in 1920.

History

Early years

The first match that Team Melli played was on 23 August 1941, away at Kabul in a 1–0 win against British India, while Iran's first FIFA international match was on 25 August 1941, away at Afghanistan. Iran won the Asian Cup three consecutive times (1968, 1972, 1976), to which the team has not been able to add since.

1978 FIFA World Cup in Argentina
Additional information: 1978 FIFA World Cup qualification (AFC and OFC)
Additional information: 1978 FIFA World Cup – Group 4

In 1978, Iran made its first appearance in the World Cup after defeating Australia in Tehran. Iran lost two of three group stage matches against the Netherlands and Peru. Team Melli managed to surprise the footballing community by securing one point in its first ever World Cup appearance against Scotland which saw Iraj Danaeifard cancel out an own goal scored by Andranik Eskandarian for the 1–1 draw.

References

Iran national football team
Iran
National football team